Voice of Hope is a 2014 album by South African opera singer Pumeza Matshikiza. The album was released on Decca Records.

Releases and contents
The album was first released in Germany, Austria and Switzerland on 3 March 2014 with 18 tracks. An international edition was released later with a different cover and an amended order of track list and just 15 tracks.

The album includes four arias ("O mio babbino caro", "Signore, ascolta!" and "Donde lieta uscì" from Puccini and "Vedrai, carino" from Mozart) all with musical accompaniment from Staatsorchester Stuttgart and Simon Hewett. The other tracks are mostly performed with the accompaniment of Aurora Orchestra and Iain Farrington. There is also the song "Lakutshon Ilanga (When The Sun Sets)" performed with Royal Liverpool Philharmonic and Iain Farrington.

The last track of the international album, "Freedom Come All Ye" was a collaboration and performed by Pumeza Matshikiza with Sura Susso, Mamadou Ndiaye Cissokho, Fiona Hamilton and Phil Cunningham.

The earlier version destined for German, Austrian and Swiss markets contains four tracks that have not been included in the international release, namely "Ntyilo Ntyilo (Little Bird)", "Baxabene Oxam (Click Song 2)", "Senzeni Na? (What Have We Done?)" and the South African national anthems "Nkosi Sikelel' iAfrika (God Bless Africa)". In two of these tracks, "Senzeni Na?" and "Nkosi Sikelel' iAfrika", she invited the African Children's Choir to sing with her.

Track listing
The international edition contains 15 tracks. A special edition was released for Germany, Austria and Switzerland with a different cover and with three additional tracks not found on the international release.

International release

Germany, Austria and Switzerland release

Charts

References

External links

2014 classical albums
Classical albums by South African artists